The 1841 Massachusetts gubernatorial election was held on November 8.

Incumbent Whig Governor John Davis was re-elected to a second consecutive term in office over Democrat Marcus Morton.

General election

Candidates
Marcus Morton, former Governor (Democratic)
John Davis, former Governor and U.S. Senator (Whig)
Lucius Boltwood (Liberty)

Results

See also
 1841 Massachusetts legislature

References

Governor
1841
Massachusetts
November 1841 events